Harcourt Butler Technical University (HBTU) is a Premier State Technical University in Kanpur, Uttar Pradesh, India. The HBTU was named after Sir Spencer Harcourt Butler, Governor of the United Provinces in British India. Its programs have been conferred in autonomous status under the university. It is one of the oldest engineering institutes in the country and holds the ISO 9001:2000 certification. It offers Bachelors, Masters, and Doctoral programs in engineering, natural sciences and humanities as well as Masters programs in Computer Application (MCA) and Business Administration (MBA).

HBTU is the mother institute of the National Sugar Institute (in 1936, then known as Imperial Institute of Sugar Technology), the Government Central Textile Institute (in 1937), now known as the Uttar Pradesh Textile Technology Institute, Indian Institute of Technology Kanpur (IIT/K) in 1960, the Glass Institute and Rajkiya Engineering College Mainpuri (also known as Government Engineering College, GEC/M) in 2015. It was also one of the 127 technical institutions in India which were the recipients of funding from World Bank's International Development Association (IDA) in the phase one (2004–2009) of the Technical Engineering Educational Quality Improvement Project – the first World Bank project in Higher education in India.

History 
The history of Harcourt Butler Technical University dates back to the 1920s when there was a growing realization of the need for advancement in science and technology among the people of what was then called the United Provinces. Consequently, the Indian Industrial Commission, 1916–18, at its Nainital meeting proposed two institutions for engineering — one at Roorkee (at Roorkee, the Thompson College of Civil Engineering was established in 1847 by Colonel Proby Cautley, making Roorkee older than HBTI) and the other at Kanpur. To boost entrepreneurship, accelerate industrial development, create a sound environment for contemporary applied research, and inculcate scientific temper, an institute called Government Research Institute, Cawnpore was started in 1920. It was housed in the two rooms of what was called Bhoot Wali Kothi. The old majestic building is still intact at the northwest corner of the Company Bagh crossing, near Nawabganj. Dr. H. E. Annett, who was then the Principal of the Opium Research Laboratory, Cawnpore, of which the new institute was an adjunct, was appointed as the head.

On 25 November 1921, the then governor of the United Provinces, Sir Spencer Harcourt Butler (1869–1938), K.C.S.I., C.I.E., formally laid the foundation of the present main (administration) building. The Government Research Institute at Cawnpoore was rechristened Government Technological Institute at that time.  In 1928, the G.T.I. was given the name Harcourt Butler Technological Institute. Its first principal of Indian nationality was Shri Dattatreya Yashwant Athawale. As of 1 September 2016, it was granted a university status and renamed Harcourt Butler Technical University under the HBTU Act, 2016 passed by the Government of Uttar Pradesh.

Academics 

HBTU offers its students a vide variety of UG and PG courses, awarding Bachelor of Technology (B.Tech.), Master of Computer Applications (MCA), Master of Business Administration (MBA), Master of Sciences (M.Sc.), Master of Technology (M.Tech.), and Doctor of Philosophy (Ph.D.)

B.Tech. courses are offered in 13 fields of engineering and technology, namely Computer Science and Engineering, Mechanical Engineering, Civil Engineering, Electronics Engineering, Electrical Engineering, Chemical Engineering, Information Technology, Plastic/Polymer Technology, Food Technology, Oil Technology, Paint Technology, Leather Technology and Biochemical Engineering. It offers admission through JEE Main.
MBA and M.Sc. programmes are started in the centenary year (1921-2021). The admission in MBA programme is through CAT / University entrance exam. The admissions in MCA programme are through NIMCET.

Campus 
The university is in the northern part of the city, near the Kanpur Zoo, and less than five kilometres away from the Ganga barrage. It is spread across two campuses – the east campus (77 acres), and the west campus (271 acres) In East Campus There are 6 hostels including 4 Girls Hostels & 2 Boys Hostels and in West campus there are 4 boys hostels. – roughly 3 km apart.

East campus (academic block) 

The academic campus shares a border with the Chandra Shekhar Azad University of Agriculture and Technology's premises. It comprises:-
The main building which was inaugurated in 1921. It houses the administrative offices, and departments of Chemical Engineering, Chemical Technology (four out of five branches), Biochemical Engineering, Physics, Chemistry, Mathematics, and Humanities. Five buildings which house the departments of Computer Science & IT, Mechanical Engineering, Electrical & Electronics Engineering, Civil Engineering, and Leather Technology. Central Library, Auditorium, Cafeteria, GIIEC Building, Parking Lot. Oil Technologist's Association of India's (OTAI) headquarters, Council of Leather Exports' (CLE) central regional office, Paint and Coating Technologist's Association's (PACT) headquarters, Institution of Engineers (India)'s Kanpur Local Centre and Polymer Engineers Technologists Association Headquarters. Garden of Bliss, BE/FT Lawn & Lawn Tennis Court Lawn. Guest House. Medical Centre. Central Bank of India (CBI) branch, and its ATM. Central Workshop (Foundry Shop, Welding Shop, Machine Shop, Blacksmithy Shop, Carpentary & Fitting Shop). Four girls' hostels (GH1, GH2, GH3 & GH4) and these hostels are now re-named as Alakhanda Hostel (Triple seated : 105 Seats), Mandakini Hostel (Triple seated : 105 Seats), Gangotri Hostel (Triple seated : 105 Seats) and Bhagirathi Hostel (Triple seated : 118 Seats) respectively. Two boys' hostels: Lake View Old (Home like Hostel), and Lake View New Hostel (Best Hostel Of College) are now re-named as Shridhracharya Hostel (Double/Triple seated : 150 Seats) and Ramanujam Hostel (Single/Triple seated : 200 Seats) respectively. Badminton and Lawn tennis courts Football and Cricket ground. Old Gymnasium (wrecked)

West campus (residential block) 

The West Campus features:-
Three boys hostels: WCH-1, WCH-2, and WCH-3 (WCH stands for West Campus Hostel), now these hostels are re-named as Abdul Kalam Hostel (Single seated : 180 Seats), Visvesaraya Hostel (Triple seated : 162 Seats) and Raman Hostel (Single seated : 180 Seats) respectively. DBRA hostels (DBRA 1 and DBRA 2 hostels). New hostels (officially known as WCH 4), now re-named as Vishwakarma hostel (Single seated : 400 Seats). Gymnasium, Community centre, Residential quarters for faculty members and other staff. State Bank of India (SBI) ATM, Postal facilities. Playgrounds for cricket, basketball and volleyball.

Administration 
HBTU is a government residential university and has the following six authorities overlooking its complete administration:
 Board of Governors
 Finance Committee
 Administrative Committee
 Building & Works Committee
 Purchase Committee
 Academic Committee

The university is headed by the Vice Chancellor (VC), Professor Samsher.

Notable alumni 
HBTU alumni are popularly known as Harcourtians. Notable alumni include:

Anil Khandelwal, Ex. Chairman and Managing Director, Bank of Baroda￼
Shri Dileep Mishra, I.A.S , 2019 batch, AIR 56
Dinesh Agarwal, Founder & CEO, IndiaMART
Yashvir Singh, MP (2009–2014) from Nagina Lok Sabha Constituency (UP)
Anu Garg, Founder, Wordsmith.org
Alakh Pandey, Founder and CEO of Physics Wallah(PW)
Onkar Singh,  Vice Chancellor, Veer Madho Singh Bhandari Uttarakhand Technical University, Dehradun and Founder Vice Chancellor of Madan Mohan Malaviya University of Technology, Gorakhpur (U.P.), India

References

External links 

Engineering colleges in Uttar Pradesh
Universities and colleges in Kanpur
Universities in Uttar Pradesh
Educational institutions established in 1921
1921 establishments in India